Echaristha is a genus of beetles in the family Cerambycidae, and the only species in the genus is Echaristha pictipennis. It was described by Fairmaire in 1901.

References

Dorcasominae
Beetles described in 1901
Monotypic Cerambycidae genera